West Sound may refer to:
 West Sound Radio network in Scotland which runs
 West FM
 West Sound (Ayrshire)
 West Sound (Dumfries and Galloway)
 West Sound, Washington, an unincorporated community on  Orcas Island in the U.S. state of Washington
 Westsound/WSX Seaplane Base, a seaplane base adjacent to West Sound, Washington